Saudi Arabia Railways (SAR), formerly the Saudi Railway Company, is the national railway company of Saudi Arabia. It is de facto a state-owned enterprise, as it is owned by the Public Investment Fund.

Saudi Railways Organization was also a major railway operator in Saudi Arabia, it was merged into Saudi Arabia Railways on 1 April 2021.

History
Saudi Arabia Railways, then the Saudi Railway Company, was established in 2006 to build, operate, and manage the north-south railway project.

Approval to merge the Saudi Railways Organization and Saudi Railway Company was announced in February 2021, and the Saudi Railways Organization was merged into the Saudi Railway Company on 1 April 2021.

The combined company is now called Saudi Arabia Railways.

Rolling stock

See also 
 Rail transport in Saudi Arabia

References

External links
SAR| Home - Saudi Arabia Railways official website

Government-owned companies of Saudi Arabia
Government-owned railway companies
Public Investment Fund
Rail transport in Saudi Arabia
Railway companies established in 2008
2008 establishments in Saudi Arabia